Anita Live! was a concert tour by American recording artist Anita Baker. After taking an eight-year hiatus from touring to spend more time with her family, in 2002 Baker decided to perform again. Baker performed seven dates in December, which eventually led to a two-year outing in North America, from 2003 to 2004.

While touring in 2003, Baker recorded songs for a new album, My Everything released September 2004. On select dates in late 2003 and 2004, she performed a few tracks from the album.

Opening act
William Troxler (Comedian)

Set list
"Mystery"
"Sweet Love"
"Been So Long"
"No One in the World"
"Same Ole Love (365 Days A Year)"
"Just Because"
"Lead Me Into Love"
"Caught Up in the Rapture"
"Watch Your Step"
"Angel"
"How Does It Feel?" 2 (NEW)
"Talk to Me" 1
"I Apologize"
"Body and Soul"
"My Everything" 2 (NEW)
"No More Tears" 1
"Rules" 1
"You Bring Me Joy"
"You Belong to Me"
Encore
"Giving You the Best That I Got"
"Fairy Tales"

1 performed at select dates in North America.2 performed in late 2003 and 2004 at select dates in North America.

Notes
Baker's set included the main songs scheduled to perform during tour; on select dates, she ask the crowd to choose certain songs for her to sing during the show, which was not included in set list.
During the tour on select dates, Baker performed new songs, "My Everything", "Serious" and "How Does It Feel?" from her new 2004 album, My Everything.

Band
 Music Director/Drums: Ricky Lawson
 Bass guitar: Nathan East
 Percussion: Joe Mardin

Tour dates

Notes
 All tour dates are not listed for North America.

References

External links
 www.AnitaBaker.com

2002 concert tours
2003 concert tours
2004 concert tours
Anita Baker concert tours